

Largest projects 
These are the most important wind farm projects in Kosovo (larger than 10 MW):

Totals

References

See also 
:Category:Lists of wind farms

Lists of wind farms